Wanderu Inc. is a ground and air travel metasearch engine that operates throughout North America and Europe. It provides a one-stop search and booking platform for buses, trains and flights through its website and mobile app. Wanderu is headquartered in Boston, Massachusetts.

History

Foundation 
Wanderu was founded in February 2012 by Polina Raygorodskaya and Igor Bratnikov. At the time when the idea for Wanderu was conceived, Raygorodskaya and Bratnikov were part of GreenXC, a nationwide campaign intended to raise awareness for national parks and forests throughout the United States. Aiming to promote sustainable forms of transportation, the group chose ride-shares as their main form of travel hitting a snag when one of their ride-shares cancelled and they had to find a bus to get to their next destination. Since no direct bus served the route, they had no way of finding which buses could get them where they needed to go or even find the closest station to where they were. Realizing the void in the market, they set out to build Wanderu.

On August 12, 2013, Wanderu.com was officially launched to the public, covering bus and train travel within the Northeastern United States.

Growth in North America 
In May 2014, Wanderu announced a partnership with Greyhound, the largest bus travel provider in the United States. As a result, Wanderu acquired nationwide coverage.

In February 2015, Wanderu released a smartphone application for iOS devices, followed by the release an Android version in March 2015.

In April 2015, Wanderu signed a partnership with Amtrak, the largest passenger inter-city railroad service in the United States. As a result, Wanderu’s coverage increased to over 90% of the U.S. that is reachable by ground.

In November 2015, Wanderu partnered with bus companies Grupo Senda and Tufesa to offer trips to multiple destinations across Mexico, as well as options for cross-border travel between Mexico and the United States.

In February 2016, Wanderu announced a partnership with VIA Rail, an intercity passenger rail service in Canada.

Expansion to Europe 
In January 2017, Wanderu expanded into Europe, launching service to more than 1,000 destinations across more than 20 countries, including Germany, France, Austria, Belgium, the Netherlands, Switzerland, and the United Kingdom, among other places.

In Europe, Wanderu partners over 160 bus and train travel providers, including Flixbus, OUIBUS, and National Express.

Introduction of Flights 
In October 2019, through a partnership with Kayak.com, Wanderu added flights alongside bus and train travel options, allowing users to find and compare bus, train and plane trips to thousands of destinations across North America and Europe in one convenient place.

Wanderu is one of the few fare aggregators that currently allows travelers to find and compare bus, train and flight options all in the same search.

Recognition 
Wanderu was a finalist of MassChallenge in the summer of 2012 and an original member of PayPal's Start Tank in Boston.

In February 2013, Wanderu won the South by Southwest Accelerator Grand Prize in the Innovative Web Technology category.

In February 2015, Wanderu a top 3 finalist at Richard Branson’s Extreme Tech Challenge. TIME named the Wanderu app as one of its favorite iPhone apps for the week of February 19, 2015, USA Today named it one of the top budget travel apps of 2015, and CNet called it one of the best apps for booking travel. 

In April 2015, Polina Raygorodskaya and Igor Bratnikov were featured in Inc. Magazine’s annual "Top 30 Under 30 Coolest Entrepreneurs" list. In October 2015, Polina Raygorodskaya was featured by Fortune as one of "40 Under 40 Women to Watch".

In January 2016, Polina Raygorodskaya and Igor Bratnikov were featured in Forbes’ annual "30 Under 30" list in the Consumer Tech category. In November 2016, Inc. Magazine named Wanderu one of the top 15 companies of 2016.

In May 2019, Wanderu co-founder and CEO Polina Raygorodskaya received an honorary doctor of laws degree from Babson College.

References

External links 

Comparison shopping websites
Internet properties established in 2012
Companies based in Boston
Route planning software
Software companies based in Massachusetts
Travel ticket search engines
American travel websites
Software companies of the United States